Claudius Charles Davies (2 July 1879 – 12 May 1936) was a Progressive party member of the House of Commons of Canada. He was born in Bracknell, England, the son of Thomas James Davis and Amelia Lane, came to Canada in 1900 and became a farmer in North Battleford, Saskatchewan.

In 1913, Davies married Edna Ralston. He was elected to Parliament at the North Battleford riding in the 1921 general election. After serving his only federal term, the 14th Canadian Parliament, Davies was defeated by Cameron Ross McIntosh of the Liberal party in the 1925 election.

Davies was also a director of the Saskatchewan Grain Growers' Association.

References

External links
 

1879 births
1936 deaths
Canadian farmers
English expatriates in Canada
Members of the House of Commons of Canada from Saskatchewan
People from Bracknell
Progressive Party of Canada MPs